Kyle Gregory Jensen (born May 20, 1988) is an American former professional baseball outfielder. He played in Major League Baseball (MLB) for the Arizona Diamondbacks, and for the Fukuoka SoftBank Hawks of Nippon Professional Baseball (NPB).

Career
Jensen attended high school at St. Mary's High School in Stockton, California.

Florida/Miami Marlins
He was drafted by the Florida Marlins in the 12th round of the 2009 MLB Draft out of St. Mary's College of California. He was added to the Marlins' 40-man roster on November 20, 2012. Jensen started the 2013 season with the Double-A Jacksonville Suns before being promoted to the Triple-A New Orleans Zephyrs. With Jacksonville, he hit .237, with 16 doubles, 16 homers, 42 RBIs, and 5 stolen bases. With New Orleans, he hit .233 with 15 doubles, 12 homers, 36 RBIs, and 1 stolen base. Jensen began the 2014 season with New Orleans, hitting .260 with 27 homers, 92 RBIs, and 1 stolen base.

Los Angeles Dodgers
Jensen was traded to the Los Angeles Dodgers on November 17, 2014, in exchange for a player to be named later or cash considerations. On December 15, the Dodgers sent minor leaguer Craig Stem to the Marlins to complete the transaction. Jensen was designated for assignment by the Dodgers on December 19, but cleared waivers and was outrighted to the Triple-A Oklahoma City Dodgers. The Dodgers invited him to attend major league spring training in 2015. He spent the 2015 season with Oklahoma City, playing in 128 games, hitting .259 with 20 homers and 71 RBI.

Arizona Diamondbacks
Jensen signed a minor league contract with the Arizona Diamondbacks in 2016, and was promoted to the majors on September 3.

Fukuoka SoftBank Hawks
On November 29, 2016, Jensen's contract was sold to the Fukuoka SoftBank Hawks of Nippon Professional Baseball.

On November 3, 2017, the Fukuoka SoftBank Hawks released Jensen.

San Francisco Giants
On January 9, 2018, Jensen signed a minor league contract with the San Francisco Giants. He was released on June 5, 2018.

References

External links

 

1989 births
Living people
American expatriate baseball players in Japan
Arizona Diamondbacks players
Baseball players from Stockton, California
Fukuoka SoftBank Hawks players
Greensboro Grasshoppers players
Jacksonville Suns players
Jamestown Jammers players
Jupiter Hammerheads players
Major League Baseball first basemen
Major League Baseball left fielders
Major League Baseball right fielders
Naranjeros de Hermosillo players
American expatriate baseball players in Mexico
New Orleans Zephyrs players
Nippon Professional Baseball first basemen
Oklahoma City Dodgers players
Phoenix Desert Dogs players
Sportspeople from Walnut Creek, California
Reno Aces players
Sacramento River Cats players
Saint Mary's Gaels baseball players
Mat-Su Miners players